The 1902 Michigan Agricultural Aggies football team represented Michigan Agricultural College (MAC) in the 1902 college football season. In their second and final year under head coach George Denman, the Aggies compiled a 4–5 record and were outscored by their opponents 206 to 93.

Schedule

Game summaries

Michigan
On Wednesday, October 8, 1902, the Aggies played a mid-week game against Michigan. Michigan defeated the Aggies by a score of 119 to 0. The Wolverines scored 71 points in the first half of 20 minutes and 48 in the second half of 18 minutes.  The Michigan Alumnus called it "the greatest fusillade of touchdowns ever known to the football world," excluding Michigan's 128–0 win over Buffalo in 1901. Michigan was held on downs only once in the game, and the Aggies made only three first downs. Right halfback Albert Herrnstein ran back a kickoff the length of the field and scored seven touchdowns in the game. Willie Heston and Everett Sweeley did not play in the game, and the Detroit Free Press noted: "The opinion is quite general that if Heston and Sweeley had been in the game the Buffalo record would have been beaten, but, as it was, Michigan was simply fagged out running down the field for touchdowns." After the game, The Newark Advocate wrote:"Michigan has undoubtedly the fastest scoring team in the world, and the Ann Arbor boys play Yosts' 'hurry up' formations like clock work. It requires a fast team to take the ball, line up and score 119 points, even if they have no opponents in two 20 minute halves."

References

Michigan Agricultural
Michigan State Spartans football seasons
Michigan Agricultural Aggies football